The Hecla House, in Beaverhead County, Montana near Melrose, was built in 1881.  It was listed on the National Register of Historic Places in 2005.

It is a one-story  log building, built of squared logs with dovetail notching upon a dry fieldstone foundation.  It is the last standing building in the former townsite of Hecla, a company mining town below the glacial cirque headwall of Lion Mountain.

References

Log buildings and structures on the National Register of Historic Places in Montana
National Register of Historic Places in Beaverhead County, Montana
Houses completed in 1881
Rustic architecture in Montana
Log houses in the United States
Houses on the National Register of Historic Places in Montana